This is a list of the rulers of Greenland:

 The Norse Colony of Greenland (982–1261)
 The Kingdom of Norway (1261–1814)
 The personal union of Norway and Sweden (1319–1343)
 The personal union of Norway and Denmark (1380–1385)
 The personal union of Norway, Sweden and Denmark (1385–1387)
 The Kalmar Union (1397–1523)
 The personal union of Norway and Denmark (1523–1814)
 The Kingdom of Denmark (1814–1979)
 The Home Rule of Greenland (since 1979)

Part of the Kingdom of Norway, from 1261 to 1814

Greenland as an integral part of Norway under the Monarchy of Norway

From the 1260s, the Norse colony on Greenland recognised the King of Norway as their overlord.  Norway entered into a personal union with Denmark in 1380 and from 1397 was part of the Kalmar Union.  From 1536, after Sweden had broken out of the union, Norway entered into a closer dependency with Denmark in the kingdom of Denmark–Norway, which existed until 1814. From the Middle Ages up until 1814, official Danish documents made clear that Greenland was a part of Norway.

The House of Sverre
1261–1263 : Haakon IV Haakonsson
1263–1280 : Magnus VI Haakonsson
1280–1299 : Eric II Magnusson
1299–1319 : Haakon V Magnusson

The House of Bjelbo
1319–1343 : Magnus VII Eriksson
1343–1380 : Haakon VI Magnusson
1380–1387 : Olaf IV Haakonsson

The House of Estridsen
1387–1412 : Margaret I

The House of Griffins
1412–1442 : Eric of Pomerania

The House of Palatinate-Neumarkt
1442–1448 : Christopher of Bavaria

The House of Bonde
1449–1450 : Charles I

The House of Oldenburg
1450–1481 : Christian I
1481–1513 : John I
1513–1523 : Christian II
1523–1533 : Frederick I
1534–1559 : Christian III
1559–1588 : Frederick II
1588–1648 : Christian IV
1648–1670 : Frederick III
1670–1699 : Christian V
1699–1730 : Frederick IV
1730–1746 : Christian VI
1746–1766 : Frederick V
1766–1808 : Christian VII
1808–1814 : Frederick VI

Part of the Kingdom of Denmark, from 1814 to the present

Greenland as a dependency of the Kingdom of Denmark

In 1814, Denmark-Norway found itself on the losing side of the Napoleonic Wars. In gratitude to Sweden for its assistance in defeating Napoleon (and as a consolation for the recent loss of Finland to Russia), mainland Norway and certain Norwegian territories were transferred to Sweden — thus, the personal union of Norway and Denmark ended. The dependencies of Greenland, Iceland and the Faroe Islands, however, remained part of the reorganised Kingdom of Denmark. Unlike Iceland, which was recognised as a sovereign monarchy united with Denmark under the same monarch in 1918, Greenland has remained a Danish dependency, currently under the reigning monarch Margrethe II of Denmark.

The House of Oldenburg
1814–1839 : Frederick VI
1839–1848 : Christian VIII
1848–1863 : Frederick VII

The House of Glücksburg
1863–1906 : Christian IX
1906–1912 : Frederick VIII
1912–1947 : Christian X
1947–1972 : Frederick IX
1972–present : Margrethe II

See also

List of inspectors of Greenland
List of governors of Greenland
List of prime ministers of Greenland
Norse colonization of the Americas
Danish colonization of the Americas
Erik the Red's Land
History of Greenland
Politics of Greenland
List of rulers of Iceland

References

Greenland
Rulers
Government of Denmark
Government of Greenland